Algiers  is a historic neighborhood of New Orleans and is the only Orleans Parish community located on the West Bank of the Mississippi River. Algiers is known as the 15th Ward, one of the 17 Wards of New Orleans. It was once home to many jazz musicians and is also the second oldest neighborhood in the city.

Neighborhoods

Algiers contains many neighborhoods such as
 Algiers Point
 McDonogh
 Old Aurora
 New Aurora
 Lower Algiers (Cutoff, River Park)
 Whitney
 Behrman
 Fischer Housing Development
 Tall Timbers/Brechtel
 McClendonville

Education

Primary and secondary schools
Algiers is zoned to schools in the Orleans Parish School Board (OPSB), also known as New Orleans Public Schools (NOPS). The district has its headquarters in the Westbank area of Algiers.

The schools include:
 Martin Behrman Elementary School (K-8)- Algiers Point
 Dwight D. Eisenhower Elementary School (K-8)- Tall Timbers/Brechtel
 William J. Fischer Elementary School (K-8)- Fischer Development
 McDonogh #32 Elementary School (K-8)- McDonogh
 L.B. Landry High School - Old Algiers
 O.P. Walker High School - Old Algiers
The InspireNola Charter Schools operate
 Edna Karr High School- Old Aurora
 Alice M. Harte Elementary School (K-8)- Old Aurora
Crescent City Schools include
 Harriet Tubman Charter Elementary School
 Paul B Habans Elementary School

One campus of the International School of Louisiana (ISL) is in Algiers.

Notable people

 Henry "Red" Allen, jazz trumpeter and singer raised at 414 Newton St.
 Joe Blakk, rapper
 Peter Bocage, jazz trumpeter and violinist, raised at 425 Brooklyn Ave.
 Gary Carter, Jr.,  politician
 Papa Celestin, jazz trumpeter moved to Algiers in 1900 
 J. Lawton Collins, World War II general
 Frankie Duson, jazz trombonist
 G-Slimm, rapper
 Alvin Haymond, retired NFL player
 Rich Jackson, former NFL defensive end
 Anthony Johnson, NFL defensive tackle for the New England Patriots
 Cee Pee Johnson, jazz drummer and vocalist
 Freddie Kohlman, jazz drummer raised at 428 Homer St.
 George Lewis, jazz clarinetist
 Kendrick Lewis, NFL free safety for the Baltimore Ravens 
 Lance Louis, NFL offensive guard for the Indianapolis Colts 
 Manuel Manetta, jazz musician raised at 416 Powder St.
 Memphis Minnie, blues singer and guitarist
 Jimmy Palao, jazz musician raised at 900 Verret St.
 Malik Rahim, Black Panther Party member and activist
 James Ray, Denver Nuggets power forward
 Cyril Richardson, NFL guard for the Buffalo Bills
 Virgil Robinson former NFL New Orleans Saints running back
 Lou Sino, jazz trombonist and singer
 Herb Tyler, LSU quarterback
 Kid Thomas Valentine, jazz trumpeter and pioneer of the Preservation Hall Jazz band raised at 825 Vallette St.
 Mike Wallace, NFL wide receiver for the Baltimore Ravens
 Eddie Bo, singer
 Joe Thomas, jazz clarinetist
 Lester Young, jazz saxophonist 
 Bobby Mitchell, singer 
 Herman Riley, jazz saxophonist
 Jim Robinson, jazz trombonist, moved to Algiers in 1911
 Clarence "Frogman" Henry, rhythm and blues singer 
 Tom Albert, jazz violinist, and trumpeter

See also 
Algiers Point
Canal Street Ferry
History of New Orleans
National Register of Historic Places listings in Orleans Parish, Louisiana
Neighborhoods in New Orleans
Wards of New Orleans

References

External links

 Algiers Point Association
 Algiers Point Information and Links page
 Cita Dennis Hubbell Library
 City of New Orleans
 Southern Pacific Historical & Technical Society

Louisiana populated places on the Mississippi River
Neighborhoods in New Orleans
15